Kruščica, which translates as Pear from Serbo-Croatian may refer to:

 Kruščica (Bela Crkva), a village in Banat, Serbia
 Kruščica (Arilje), a village in Serbia
 Kruščica, Kalinovik, a village in Bosnia and Herzegovina
 Kruščica, Konjic, a village in Bosnia and Herzegovina
 Kruščica (Jajce), a village in Bosnia and Herzegovina
 Kruščica, Montenegro, a village near Petnjica, Montenegro
 Kruščica (mountain), a mountain in central Bosnia
 Kruščica (river), a river in central Bosnia, tributary of Lašva
 Kruščica (lake), a lake in Kosinj, Croatia.
 Kruščica concentration camp
 Tribanj Kruščica, a village in Croatia

See also
 Krušćica (disambiguation)